Portrait of Professor Benjamin H. Rand is an 1874 painting by Thomas Eakins. It is oil on canvas and depicts Benjamin H. Rand, a doctor at Jefferson Medical College who taught Eakins anatomy. In the painting, Rand is reading a book while petting a cat.

The portrait was the first Eakins made of someone outside his family. It is a prelude to what he considered his most important painting, The Gross Clinic (1875). Rand donated it to Jefferson Medical College when he retired.

It was purchased by Alice L. Walton for an estimated US$20 million in April 2007, to be housed at the Crystal Bridges Museum of American Art.

References

External links
Portrait of Professor Benjamin H. Rand via the Eakins Gallery

1874 paintings
Rand
Rand
Collection of the Crystal Bridges Museum of American Art
Rand
Cats in art
Books in art